Lenon may refer to:

Barnaby Lenon (born 1954), British schoolmaster
Edmund Henry Lenon (1838–1893), British Army officer
Paris Lenon (born 1977), American football player in the National Football League
Trudi Lenon, Australian murderer
Lenon (footballer, born 1990), Lenon Fernandes Ribeiro, Brazilian football defensive midfielder
Lenon (footballer, born 1996), Lenon Farias de Souza Leite, Brazilian football forward

See also
Lennon (disambiguation)
Lenin (disambiguation)